Moods is an album by American jazz pianist Mal Waldron, recorded in 1978, and released by the Enja label. Originally released as a double LP, the CD reissue omitted three of the piano solos (which were included as bonus tracks on the CD reissue of One-Upmanship) to fit onto one compact disc and altered the running order; a later CD reissue reinstated Waldron's "Soul Eyes".

Reception
The Allmusic review by Scott Yanow awarded the album 4 stars, stating: "This enjoyable and subtle music gives one a well-rounded picture of Mal Waldron's talents in the late 1970s."

Track listing
All compositions by Mal Waldron except as indicated
 "Minoat" — 8:11
 "A Case of Plus 4's" — 15:04
 "Sieg Haile" — 19:09
 "Anxiety" — 3:33
 "Thoughtful" — 6:07  Omitted on CD reissue
 "Lonely" — 6:33
 "Happiness" — 3:03
 "Soul Eyes" — 6:52  Omitted on first CD reissue
 "I Thought About You" (Jimmy Van Heusen) — 7:38
 "Duquility" — 8:31   Omitted on CD reissue
Recorded at Tonstudio Bauer in Ludwigsburg, West Germany, on May 6 (tracks 1––3) and May 8, 1978 (tracks 4–10).

Personnel
 Mal Waldron — piano
 Terumasa Hino — trumpet (tracks 1-3)
 Hermann Breuer — trombone (tracks 1-3)
 Steve Lacy — soprano saxophone (tracks 1-3)
 Cameron Brown — bass (tracks 1-3)
 Makaya Ntshoko — drums (tracks 1-3)

References

Enja Records albums
Mal Waldron albums
Steve Lacy (saxophonist) albums
1978 albums